The 2017 World Rugby Under 20 Trophy was the tenth annual international rugby union competition for Under 20 national teams, second-tier world championship.

The event was held at the Estadio Charrúa and Estadio Domingo Burgueño in Montevideo, Uruguay from 29 August until 10 September and was organized by rugby's governing body, World Rugby.

Qualified teams 
A total of 8 teams played in the tournament. The host (Uruguay) and the Junior World Cup relegation country (Japan) qualified automatically. The remaining six countries competed through a qualification process in regional competitions (North America, South America, Europe, Africa, Asia, Oceania).

Host (1)
 
Relegated from 2016 JWC
 
Asia Rugby (1)
 
Rugby Africa (1)
 

Sudamérica Rugby (1)
 
Rugby Americas North (1)
 
Rugby Europe (1)
 
Oceania Rugby (1)

Pool Stage

Pool A 

{| class="wikitable" style="text-align: center;"
|-
!width="200"|Team
!width="25"|Pld
!width="25"|W
!width="25"|D
!width="25"|L
!width="35"|PF
!width="35"|PA
!width="35"|PD
!width="25"|TF
!width="25"|TA
!width="25"|Pts
|-
|align=left| 
| 3||3||0||0||111||47||+64||11||7||14
|-
|align=left| 
| 3||2||0||1||77||68||+9||10||5||10
|-
|align=left| 
| 3||1||0||2||86||89||-3||8||8||7
|-
|align=left| 
| 3||0||0||3||56||126||-70||4||13||1
|}

Pool B 

{| class="wikitable" style="text-align: center;"
|-
!width="200"|Team
!width="25"|Pld
!width="25"|W
!width="25"|D
!width="25"|L
!width="35"|PF
!width="35"|PA
!width="35"|PD
!width="25"|TF
!width="25"|TA
!width="25"|Pts
|-
|align=left| 
| 3||3||0||0||67||55||+12||6||5||12
|-
|align=left| 
| 3||2||0||1||118||33||+85||7||3||11
|-
|align=left| 
| 3||1||0||2||42||57||-15||4||6||6
|-
|align=left| 
| 3||0||0||3||41||123||-82||4||7||1
|}

Finals 

 7th place

 5th place

 3rd place

 Final

References 

2017
2017 rugby union tournaments for national teams
rugby union
International rugby union competitions hosted by Uruguay
rugby union
rugby union